Kelvin Hoefler (born 10 February 1994) is a Brazilian professional street skateboarder. He won the silver medal in the inaugural Olympic men's street skateboarding event at the 2020 Summer Olympics in Tokyo.

Career 
Hoefler began skateboarding at age eight in his hometown of Guarujá in the Brazilian state of São Paulo. After winning some events in his early teens, he committed to pursuing skateboarding as a career. He made his professional debut in 2011.

Hoefler steadily climbed the ranks throughout the 2010s to become one of the leading street skateboarders in the world. He has medaled at every major skateboarding tournament – Olympics, World Skateboarding Championship, and X Games – and has won multiple events in the Street League Skateboarding (SLS) and Dew Tour circuits. His top titles include World Championship gold in 2015, X Games Minneapolis gold in 2017, X Games Norway gold in 2018, and silver at the 2020 Summer Olympics.

His sponsors include Powell-Peralta, Monster, and G-Shock.

References

External links
 

1994 births
Living people
Brazilian skateboarders
X Games athletes
People from Guarujá
Skateboarders at the 2020 Summer Olympics
Medalists at the 2020 Summer Olympics
Olympic silver medalists for Brazil
Olympic medalists in skateboarding
Olympic skateboarders of Brazil
Sportspeople from São Paulo (state)
21st-century Brazilian people